The following is a partial list of the "C" codes for Medical Subject Headings (MeSH), as defined by the United States National Library of Medicine (NLM).

This list continues the information at List of MeSH codes (C18). Codes following these are found at List of MeSH codes (C20). For other MeSH codes, see List of MeSH codes.

The source for this content is the set of 2006 MeSH Trees from the NLM.

– endocrine system diseases

– adrenal gland diseases

– adrenal cortex diseases
  – adrenal cortex neoplasms
  – adrenocortical adenoma
  – adrenocortical carcinoma

– adrenal gland neoplasms
  – adrenal cortex neoplasms
  – adrenocortical adenoma
  – adrenocortical carcinoma

– adrenal hyperplasia, congenital

– adrenal insufficiency
  – addison disease
  – adrenoleukodystrophy
  – hypoaldosteronism
  – waterhouse-friderichsen syndrome

– adrenocortical hyperfunction
  – cushing syndrome
  – hyperaldosteronism
  – bartter syndrome

– diabetes mellitus

– diabetes complications
  – diabetic angiopathies
  – diabetic foot
  – diabetic retinopathy
  – diabetic coma
  – hyperglycemic hyperosmolar nonketotic coma
  – diabetic ketoacidosis
  – diabetic nephropathies
  – diabetic neuropathies
  – diabetic foot
  – fetal macrosomia

– diabetes, gestational

– diabetes mellitus, experimental

– diabetes mellitus, type 1
  – wolfram syndrome

– diabetes mellitus, type 2
  – diabetes mellitus, lipoatrophic

– prediabetic state

– dwarfism

– congenital hypothyroidism

– dwarfism, pituitary

– laron syndrome

– endocrine gland neoplasms

– adrenal gland neoplasms
  – adrenal cortex neoplasms
  – adrenocortical adenoma
  – adrenocortical carcinoma

– multiple endocrine neoplasia
  – multiple endocrine neoplasia type 1
  – multiple endocrine neoplasia type 2a
  – multiple endocrine neoplasia type 2b

– ovarian neoplasms
  – granulosa cell tumor
  – luteoma
  – meigs syndrome
  – sertoli-leydig cell tumor
  – thecoma

– pancreatic neoplasms
  – adenoma, islet cell
  – insulinoma
  – carcinoma, islet cell
  – gastrinoma
  – glucagonoma
  – somatostatinoma
  – vipoma
  – carcinoma, pancreatic ductal

– paraneoplastic endocrine syndromes

– parathyroid neoplasms

– pituitary neoplasms
  – acth-secreting pituitary adenoma
  – nelson syndrome
  – growth hormone-secreting pituitary adenoma
  – prolactinoma

– testicular neoplasms
  – sertoli-leydig cell tumor

– thyroid neoplasms
  – thyroid nodule

– gonadal disorders

– hypogonadism
  – eunuchism
  – Kallmann syndrome
  – Klinefelter syndrome
  – sexual infantilism

– ovarian diseases
  – anovulation
  – oophoritis
  – ovarian cysts
  – polycystic ovary syndrome
  – ovarian failure, premature
  – ovarian hyperstimulation syndrome
  – ovarian neoplasms
  – brenner tumor
  – carcinoma, endometrioid
  – granulosa cell tumor
  – luteoma
  – meigs syndrome
  – sertoli-leydig cell tumor
  – thecoma

– puberty, delayed

– puberty, precocious

– sex differentiation disorders
  – adrenogenital syndrome
  – freemartinism
  – gonadal dysgenesis
  – gonadal dysgenesis, 46,xx
  – gonadal dysgenesis, 46,xy
  – gonadal dysgenesis, mixed
  – turner syndrome
  – hermaphroditism
  – hermaphroditism, true
  – pseudohermaphroditism
  – androgen-insensitivity syndrome
  – hyperandrogenism
  – kallmann syndrome
  – klinefelter syndrome

– testicular diseases
  – cryptorchidism
  – orchitis
  – testicular neoplasms
  – sertoli-leydig cell tumor

– parathyroid diseases

– hyperparathyroidism
  – hyperparathyroidism, primary
  – hyperparathyroidism, secondary
  – renal osteodystrophy

– hypoparathyroidism
  – digeorge syndrome

– parathyroid neoplasms

– pituitary diseases

– diabetes insipidus
  – diabetes insipidus, neurogenic
  – wolfram syndrome

– empty sella syndrome

– hyperpituitarism
  – acromegaly
  – gigantism
  – hyperprolactinemia
  – pituitary acth hypersecretion

– hypopituitarism
  – dwarfism, pituitary

– inappropriate adh syndrome

– pituitary apoplexy

– pituitary neoplasms
  – acth-secreting pituitary adenoma
  – nelson syndrome
  – growth hormone-secreting pituitary adenoma
  – prolactinoma

– polyendocrinopathies, autoimmune

– thyroid diseases

– euthyroid sick syndromes

– goiter
  – goiter, endemic
  – goiter, nodular
  – goiter, substernal
  – Graves' disease
  – Graves' ophthalmopathy
  – lingual goiter

– hyperthyroidism
  – Graves' disease
  – Graves' ophthalmopathy
  – thyrotoxicosis
  – thyroid crisis

– hyperthyroxinemia
  – hyperthyroxinemia, familial dysalbuminemic
  – thyroid hormone resistance syndrome

– hypothyroidism
  – congenital hypothyroidism
  – myxedema

– thyroid dysgenesis
  – lingual thyroid
  – lingual goiter

– thyroid neoplasms
  – thyroid nodule

– thyroiditis
  – thyroiditis, autoimmune
  – hashimoto disease
  – postpartum thyroiditis
  – thyroiditis, subacute
  – thyroiditis, suppurative

– thyrotoxicosis
  – thyroid crisis

– tuberculosis, endocrine

The list continues at List of MeSH codes (C20).

C19